Toolleen is a town in northern Victoria, Australia.

During the Victorian Gold Rush and after the discovery of gold at nearby Rushworth, Toolleen was a busy intersection where the roads linking Bendigo, Beechworth, Melbourne and the Murray River port of Echuca crossed.

Toolleen Post Office opened on 12 July 1872.

The town is now mainly an agricultural region, with wine grape growing becoming more popular.

References

External links

Towns in Victoria (Australia)
Bendigo
Suburbs of Bendigo